Hazchem (from hazardous chemicals) is a warning plate system used in Australia, Hong Kong, Malaysia, New Zealand, India and the United Kingdom for vehicles transporting hazardous substances, and on storage facilities. The top-left section of the plate gives the Emergency Action Code (EAC) telling the fire brigade what actions to take if there's an accident or fire. The middle-left section containing a 4 digit number gives the UN Substance Identification Number describing the material. The lower-left section gives the telephone number that should be called if special advice is needed. The warning symbol in the top right indicates the general hazard class of the material. The bottom-right of the plate carries a company logo or name.

There is also a standard null Hazchem plate to indicate the transport of non-hazardous substances. The null plate does not include an EAC or substance identification.

The National Chemical Emergency Centre (NCEC) in the United Kingdom provides a Free Online Hazchem Guide.

Emergency Action Code 
The Emergency Action Code (EAC) is a three character code displayed on all dangerous goods classed carriers, and provides a quick assessment to first responders and emergency responders (i.e. fire fighters and police) of what actions to take should the carrier carrying such goods become involved in an incident (traffic collision, for example). EAC's are characterised by a single number (1 to 4) and either one or two letters (depending on the hazard).

NCEC was commissioned by the Department for Communities and Local Government (CLG) to edit the EAC List 2013 publication, outlining the application of Hazchem Emergency Actions Codes (EACs) in Britain for 2013. The Dangerous Goods Emergency Action Code (EAC) List is reviewed every two years and is an essential compliance document for all emergency services, local government and for those who may control the planning for, and prevention of, emergencies involving dangerous goods. The current EAC List is 20013. NCEC has been at the heart of the UK EAC system since its inception in the early 1970s, publishing the list on behalf of the UK Government until 1996 and resuming its management in 2008.

The printed version of the book can be purchased from TSO directly or downloaded as a PDF file from NCEC’s website.

HazChem fire suppression 
The number leading the EAC indicates the type of fire-suppressing agent that should be used to prevent or extinguish a fire caused by the chemical.

* These indicators are used only in product documentation and are displayed on vehicle plates as 2 and 3 respectively.

The system ranks suppression media in order of their suitability, so that a fire may be fought with a suppression medium of equal or higher EAC number. For example, a chemical with EAC number 2 - indicating water fog - may be fought additionally with media 3 (foam) or 4 (dry agent), but not with 1 (coarse spray). This is especially important for chemicals requiring medium 4 (dry agent), as these chemicals react violently with water and so using lowered-number media will be actively dangerous.

HazChem safety parameters 
Each EAC contains at least one letter, which determines which category the chemical falls under, and which also highlights the violence of the chemical (i.e. likelihood to spontaneously combust, explode etc.), what personal protective equipment to use while working around the chemical and what action to take when disposing of the chemical.

Each category is assigned a letter to determine what actions are required when handling, containing and disposing of the chemical in question. Eight 'major categories' exist which are commonly denoted by a black letter on a white background. Four subcategories exist which specifically deal with what type of personal protective equipment responders must wear when handling the emergency, denoted by a white letter on a black background. In Australia with the update of the Australian Dangerous Goods Code volume 7 as of 2010, the white letter on a black background has been removed, making BA (breathing apparatus) a requirement at all large incidents regardless of whether the substance is involved in a fire.

If a category is classed as violent, this means that the chemical can be violently or explosively reactive, either with the atmosphere or water, or both (which could be marked by the Dangerous when Wet symbol).

Protection is divided up into three categories of personal protective equipment, Full, BA and BA for fire only. Full denotes that full personal protective equipment provisions must be used around and in contact with the chemical, which will usually include a portable breathing apparatus and water tight and chemical proof suit. BA (acronym for breathing apparatus) specifies that a portable breathing apparatus must be used at all times in and around the chemical, and BA for fire only specifies that a breathing apparatus is not necessary for short exposure periods to the chemical but is required if the chemical is alight. BA for fire only is denoted within the emergency action code as a white letter on a black background, while a black letter on a white background denotes breathing apparatus at all times. When changing the background colour is not possible (such as with handwriting), the use of brackets means the same as a black background. "3[Y]E" means the same as a white letter on a black background.

Substance control specifies what to do with the chemical in the event of a spill, either dilute or contain. Dilute means that the chemical may be washed down the drain with large quantities of water. Contain requires that the spillage must not come in contact with drains or water courses.

In the event of a chemical incident, the EAC may specify that an evacuation may be necessary as the chemical poses a public hazard which may extend beyond the immediate vicinity. If evacuation is not possible, advice to stay in doors and secure all points of ventilation may be necessary. This condition is denoted by an E at the end of any emergency action code. It is an optional letter, depending on the nature of the chemical.

Examples 

A very commonly displayed example is 3YE on petrol tankers. This means that a fire must be fought using foam or dry agent (if a small fire), that it can react violently and is explosive, that fire fighters must wear a portable breathing apparatus at all times, or if a white on black Y, only if there is a fire, and that the run-off needs to be contained. It also indicates to the incident controller that evacuation of the surrounding area may be necessary.

Calculation of Hazchem action code for multi-loads or sites with multiple Hazchem codes 

Example:

There are three substances to be carried as a multi-load, having emergency action codes of 3Y, •2S and 4WE.

1st Character (Number):
The first character of the EAC for each of the three substances is 3, 2 and 4. The highest number must be taken as the first character of the code for the multi-load and therefore the first character will be 4. The bullet in •2S is not assigned to the mixed load because other EACs do not include a bullet.

2nd Character (Letter):
The second character for the EAC for each of the three substances is Y, S and W. Taking the Y along the top row of the chart and the S along the left hand column, the intersection is at Y and therefore the character for the first two substances would be Y. This resultant character (Y) is then taken along the top row and the character for the third substance (W) is taken along the left hand column. The intersection point is now W. The second character of the code for the three substances is therefore W.

Letter ‘E’:
The third substance has an ‘E’ as a third character and therefore the multi-load must also have an ‘E’.

The resultant Hazchem Code for the three substances carried as a multi-load will therefore be 4WE.

See also 
 Hazmat
 NFPA 704—the equivalent system for marking the presence of dangerous goods buildings and fixed storage tanks in the United States, intended for emergency services.
 ADR—the equivalent system used for identifying dangerous goods while being transported in mainland Europe.
 Globally Harmonized System of Classification and Labelling of Chemicals—a new international standard for marking hazardous materials.
 Hazardous Materials Identification System—a system for marking dangerous materials in the United States, intended for workers.

References

External links 
 NCEC Dangerous Goods Emergency Action List 2017
 EAC List 2013
 Example of UK Hazchem Panel with Hazchem Emergency Action Code (EAC)
 General 'Hazchem Information for UK Emergency Services' Site
 Dangerous Goods Emergency Action Code List
 Dangerous Goods-Hazmat Group, a Yahoo-hosted global network for discussion of dangerous goods and hazardous materials storage and handling issues.

Symbols
Safety codes
Standards of the United Kingdom
Warning systems